Austria competed at the 1912 Summer Olympics in Stockholm, Sweden.
Austrian and Hungarian results at early Olympic Games are generally kept separate despite the union of the two nations as Austria-Hungary at the time. 85 competitors, 76 men and 6 women, took part in 46 events in 12 sports.

Medalists

Aquatics

Swimming

Eight swimmers competed for Austria at the 1912 Games. It was the fifth time the nation had competed in swimming, a sport in which Austria had competed at each Olympic Games. The team finished with a bronze medal, won in the women's relay event, for the third straight time that the Austrian swimming team had won precisely one bronze medal.

None of the Austrian swimmers advanced to the finals in their individual events; only two reached the semifinals. The women's relay team was one of four to compete. A single race was held, in which the Austrian women came in third behind Great Britain and Germany but before the host Sweden.

 Men

 Women

Water polo

Austria made its Olympic water polo debut in 1912. The team advanced to the final, on the strength of a one-goal win over Hungary in the quarterfinals and a bye in the semifinals. Austria was then crushed by the British side, 8 to nil, in the final. Following this, and due to the use of the Bergvall System for the tournament, the Austrians did not automatically win the silver medal (as they would in a standard single-elimination tournament) but had to compete further. Their first silver-medal round match was against Sweden; a win in this match would pit the Austrians against Belgium for silver and bronze. Austria lost, however, and thus their match against Belgium meant either bronze or fourth place for the squad. A tight loss to the Belgians dropped the Austrian side from the medals race.

 Quarterfinals

 Final

 Silver round 1

 Silver round 2

Athletics

12 athletes represented Austria. It was the third appearance of the nation in athletics. Hans Tronner's fifth-place finish in the discus throw was the best result for Austria in 1912, tying the best placing in the nation's history for athletics.

The rank given is the rank in that athlete's heat.

Cycling

6 cyclists represented Austria. It was the second appearance of the nation in cycling, in which Austria had not competed since 1896. Robert Rammer was the first Austrian to finish the time trial, which was the only cycling race held; he placed 23rd. As a team, the top four Austrian cyclists placed 7th out of the 15 competing teams.

Road cycling

Diving

A single diver represented Austria, which was one of three nations (along with Great Britain and host Sweden) to send women to the first Olympic women's diving competition. It was Austria's first appearance in diving. Hanny Kellner did not finish the competition.

Fencing

12 fencers represented Austria. It was the fourth appearance of the nation in fencing, in which Austria had not competed in 1904. The sabre team's second-place finish was Austria's best fencing result to date, as the nation had done no better than bronze before. It was Otto Herschmann's second silver medal—he had won one in swimming 16 years earlier. Richard Verderber, another member of the sabre team, was the only Austrian to qualify for the final in an individual event, winning the bronze in the foil event.

Football

Round of 16

Quarterfinals

Consolation quarterfinals

Consolation semifinals

Consolation final

Final rank 6th place

Modern pentathlon 

Austria had one competitor in the first Olympic pentathlon competition.

(The scoring system was point-for-place in each of the five events, with the smallest point total winning.)

Rowing 

Six rowers represented Austria. It was the nation's first appearance in rowing. Neither of Austria's two boats finished their first round heats.

(Ranks given are within each crew's heat.)

Shooting 

Seven shooters represented Austria. It was the nation's first appearance in shooting.

Tennis 

Three tennis players represented Austria at the 1912 Games. It was the nation's second appearance, and two of the players were veterans of the 1908 Summer Olympics. These two, Pipes and Zborzil, gave the nation its first Olympic medal in tennis with their silver in the outdoor doubles—an event in which they had lost a quarterfinal match four years earlier.

 Men

Wrestling

Greco-Roman

Eight wrestlers competed in Austria's Olympic wrestling debut, two each in four of the five weight classes. Four of the eight reached the fourth round of competition before receiving their second loss, but none was able to advance further into the tournament.

References

External links
Official Olympic Reports
International Olympic Committee results database

Nations at the 1912 Summer Olympics
1912
Olympics